Kawai is a town in the southeast of northern Indian state of Rajasthan. It is located around 40 kilometers south of the Baran district. There are many facilities like a railway station, a hospital, schools, and markets, as well as roads for traffic.[1]

Climate 
The town has a dry climate except during monsoon. The summer runs from March to mid of June, as in most parts of the country. The period from mid of June to September is the monsoon season followed by the months October to mid of November constitute the post monsoon or the retreating monsoon. January is generally the coldest month with an average daily maximum temperature of 24.3 °C and the average daily minimum temperature of 10.6 °C. Usually, the town has a dry climate but in monsoons, the weather becomes humid. The months from November to February constitute winter. The average rainfall experienced by the town is around 895.2 mm.

Adani Power Plant 
The plant is located at village Kawai in Atru Tehsil of Baran district in the state of Rajasthan. It is located at a distance of 16 km from Atru towards 50 km south of District headquarter of Baran and 300 km from State capital, Jaipur. Adani Power Rajasthan Limited (APRL) is the largest power producer plant in Rajasthan at a single location with a generation capacity of 1320 MW (2X660 MW). It is coal-based thermal power plant on supercritical technology.

References 

Towns in Baran District
villages in Atru Tehsil
Cities and towns in Rajasthan
Cities and towns in India
Gram Panchayats and Villages in Atru Tehsil